Super Bowl XIV was an American football game between the National Football Conference (NFC) champion Los Angeles Rams and the American Football Conference (AFC) champion Pittsburgh Steelers to decide the National Football League (NFL) champion for the 1979 season. The Steelers defeated the Rams by the score of 31–19, becoming the first team to win four Super Bowls. The game was played on January 20, 1980, at the Rose Bowl in Pasadena, California, and was attended by a Super Bowl record 103,985 spectators.

The Rams became the first team to reach the Super Bowl after posting nine wins or fewer during the regular season since the NFL season expanded to 16 games in 1978. Their 9–7 regular season record was followed by postseason wins over the Dallas Cowboys and the Tampa Bay Buccaneers. The Steelers were the defending Super Bowl XIII champions, and finished the 1979 regular season with a 12–4 record, and posted playoff victories over the Miami Dolphins and the Houston Oilers.

Despite the final score, Super Bowl XIV was a close game for the majority of the contest. The Rams led 13–10 at halftime before Steelers quarterback Terry Bradshaw connected with wide receiver Lynn Swann on a 47-yard touchdown pass. Los Angeles regained the lead on a halfback option play with running back Lawrence McCutcheon's 24-yard touchdown pass to Ron Smith. But Pittsburgh controlled the fourth quarter, scoring 14 points with Bradshaw's 73-yard touchdown pass to wide receiver John Stallworth, and running back Franco Harris' 1-yard touchdown run. Despite throwing three interceptions, Bradshaw was named Super Bowl MVP by completing 14 of 21 passes for 309 yards and two touchdowns.

Background
The NFL awarded Super Bowl XIV to Pasadena on June 14, 1977 at the owners' meetings held in New York City. For the first time since 1973, multiple Super Bowl host sites were selected at the same meeting. A total of eight cities submitted bids: Miami, Pasadena, (Rose Bowl), Los Angeles (Coliseum), Houston, New Orleans, Dallas (Cotton Bowl), Seattle (Kingdome), and Detroit (Pontiac Silverdome). Seattle and Detroit were attempting to become the first cold-weather city to host a Super Bowl, albeit inside a domed stadium. Though neither were selected, Detroit was invited to bid for a future game at the next meeting.

The selection of Pasadena came just six months after the Rose Bowl hosted its first Super Bowl (XI). Observers noted that the owners stuck with familiar venues this time around, choosing Miami for XIII and Pasadena for XIV. Early favorite Houston (Rice Stadium) reportedly fell out of favor with owners when it was revealed that birds were found in the showers of the Vikings training facility during Super Bowl VIII. Likewise New Orleans was passed over since the Superdome was already set to host Super Bowl XII.

Los Angeles Rams

Team owner Carroll Rosenbloom drowned during an off-season accident, resulting in a power struggle between his second wife, Georgia Frontiere, and his son, Steve Rosenbloom. Frontiere eventually gained control of the team and fired her stepson after the pre-season (who was promptly hired by the New Orleans Saints to become their general manager). Prior to Carroll Rosenbloom's death, the Rams had already announced their intentions to leave the Los Angeles Memorial Coliseum and move to Anaheim Stadium in Orange County for the 1980 season.

The Rams barely outscored their opponents, 323–309, and finished the regular season with a 9–7 record, the worst ever by a team who advanced to the Super Bowl (that record was later tied by the Arizona Cardinals in Super Bowl XLIII and the New York Giants in Super Bowl XLVI). The team was plagued with injuries during the regular season, including the loss of their starting quarterback Pat Haden. His replacement, Vince Ferragamo, completed less than 50 percent of his passes and threw twice as many interceptions (10) as touchdowns (5). But he still led the Rams to victory in 6 of their last 7 games.

The Rams gained 6,060 total yards of offense during the regular season, ranking second in the league. The team's main offensive weapon was running back Wendell Tyler, who rushed for 1,109 yards, caught 32 passes for 308 yards, and scored 10 touchdowns. Tyler's rushing yards came off just 218 rushing attempts, giving him a league-leading 5.1 yards per carry average. Fullback Cullen Bryant provided Tyler with excellent blocking while also gaining 846 total yards and scoring 5 touchdowns. Wide receiver Preston Dennard was the team's main deep threat, catching 43 passes for 766 yards and 4 touchdowns. The offensive line, led by tackles Doug France and Jackie Slater, guard Dennis Harrah, and Pro Bowl center Rich Saul, paved the Rams' running attack to 4th in the NFC during the season despite injuries. They also gave up only 29 sacks.

But the Rams' main strength was their defense, which featured defensive end Jack Youngblood, who made the Pro Bowl for the 7th year in a row and was playing with a broken leg, and lightning-quick Fred Dryer on the opposite end. Behind them, the Rams had two outstanding linebackers: Jack "Hacksaw" Reynolds, and Jim Youngblood (no relation to Jack), who had recorded 5 interceptions and returned 2 of them for touchdowns. The Rams also had a solid secondary, led by free safety Nolan Cromwell, who also grabbed 5 interceptions. On November 4, 1979, the Rams' defense established a still-current NFL record by holding the Seattle Seahawks' offense to a total of minus 7 yards for the game; the Seahawks finished the 1979 season 4th in the league in points scored.

Pittsburgh Steelers

The Steelers won the AFC Central with a 12–4 regular season record (including 8–0 at home), and advanced to their second consecutive Super Bowl and their fourth appearance in the last six seasons. Pittsburgh appeared to be even better than what they were in their three previous Super Bowl victories. They led the league with 6,258 yards in total offense, an average of 391 yards per game and just 31 yards short of an NFL record. The team also led the league in scoring with 416 points.

Pittsburgh quarterback Terry Bradshaw had another fine season as the leader of the Steelers offense, throwing for 3,724 yards and 26 touchdowns during the regular season (but he did throw 25 interceptions). Wide receiver John Stallworth was his top target with 70 receptions for 1,183 yards and 8 touchdowns, while wide receiver Lynn Swann caught 41 passes for 808 yards, an average of 19.7 yards per catch. Steelers starting tight end Bennie Cunningham, who missed most of the previous season due to injuries, was also a big contributor with 36 receptions for 512 yards.  
Fullback Franco Harris was the Steelers' leading rusher for the 8th consecutive season with 1,186 yards and 11 touchdowns. He also recorded his 7th consecutive season with more than 1,000 yards, tying an NFL record set by Jim Brown. Harris also had his best year as a receiver out of the backfield, recording career-highs of 36 receptions for 291 yards and another touchdown. Halfback Rocky Bleier also had another superb season, providing Harris with excellent blocking while also contributing 711 combined rushing and receiving yards. And running back Sidney Thornton also emerged as a big threat with 816 total yards and averaging 5 yards per carry. Pittsburgh also had a solid offensive line, led by center Mike Webster. The Steelers' offense did lead the NFL with a staggering 52 turnovers in the regular season, a trend that would continue in Super Bowl XIV.

The Steelers' "Steel Curtain" defense finished the regular season as the top rated defense in the AFC, limiting opponents to only 4,621 offensive yards. Up front, linemen Joe Greene and L. C. Greenwood terrorized opposing quarterbacks and rushers. And linebackers Jack Lambert and Jack Ham excelled at run stopping and pass coverage, combining for 8 interceptions. The Steelers also had a fine secondary, led by defensive backs Mel Blount, who recorded 3 interceptions, and Donnie Shell, who had 5.

Playoffs

In the playoffs, the Rams avenged the previous year's NFC Championship Game shutout loss to the Dallas Cowboys by beating them 21–19. Then they beat the Tampa Bay Buccaneers in the NFC Championship Game, 9–0, scoring only three field goals.

Meanwhile, the Steelers went on to defeat the Miami Dolphins, 34–14, and the Houston Oilers, 27–13, in the playoffs. During those two playoff games, the Pittsburgh defense limited running backs Larry Csonka and Earl Campbell, respectively, to a combined total of only 35 rushing yards. Campbell was the league's rushing leader during the regular season with 1,697 yards, but could only gain 15 yards against the Steelers in the AFC Championship Game.

Super Bowl pregame news and notes
Pittsburgh was heavily favored to win Super Bowl XIV and become the first team to win 4 Super Bowls. Most people did not think that the Rams even belonged on the same field with the Steelers. In fact, Sports Illustrated had called the NFC Championship Game "a game for losers, played by losers". One sports writer sarcastically suggested that Bradshaw throw left-handed and the Rams should be allowed to play with 12 men on the field to make the Super Bowl more competitive.

However, the Steelers were not taking their opponents lightly. In their previous meetings, the Rams held a 12–1–2 all-time record over the Steelers, including wins in 1971, 1975, and 1978.  The wins in 1975 (by a score of 10–3) and 1978 (by a score of 10–7) were over Steeler teams that eventually won the Super Bowl those seasons.  Also, the Steelers had shown clear signs of weakness when playing away from their home stadium during the season.  Their first loss of the year was on the road in a 4-turnover performance against the Philadelphia Eagles.  Two weeks later at 5–1, Pittsburgh was blown out 34–10 in Cincinnati against an 0–6 Bengals team.  In week 12, the team lost 8 turnovers (which included Bradshaw's 5 interceptions) in a 35–7 loss on the road against the San Diego Chargers.

Bradshaw became the second quarterback to start four Super Bowls, joining his counterpart from Super Bowls X and XIII Roger Staubach. Joe Montana became the third to start four Super Bowls, but all were passed by John Elway and Tom Brady, and also matched by Jim Kelly and Peyton Manning.

The Rams became the first NFC West team to reach the Super Bowl. The NFC West was the last of the six post-merger divisions to reach the Super Bowl.

Super Bowl XIV holds the record for attendance with 103,985 spectators.

Broadcasting
CBS televised the game in the United States with play-by-play announcer Pat Summerall and color commentator Tom Brookshier. One of the guest analysts for the network's studio pregame show was former Oakland Raiders coach John Madden; he impressed CBS executives so much that he replaced Brookshier as lead game analyst in 1981. CBS Radio coverage featured Jack Buck and Hank Stram; with Brent Musburger working both radio and television coverage (hosting the Super Bowl Today pregame show and the Vince Lombardi Trophy presentation). Joining Musburger on CBS' pregame coverage was the NFL Today crew of Irv Cross (who joined Musburger in the Pittsburgh Steelers locker room), Jayne Kennedy (the only Super Bowl she would be part of covering for CBS), Jimmy "The Greek" Snyder and Jack Whitaker; with George Allen as a second guest analyst; while filing remote reports from bars in the respect team's home markets were Paul Hornung in The Ginger Man in Beverly Hills (briefly joined by Jayne Kennedy's NFL Today predecessor Phyllis George and her then-husband, newly-inaugurated Kentucky Governor John Y. Brown Jr. along with Houston Oilers quarterback Dan Pastorini) and Tim Ryan at the LeMont Restaurant in Pittsburgh (which included a brief shot of the newly-redesigned Pittsburgh Penguins logo and uniform); while Dick Stockton handled the Los Angeles Rams locker room interviews. Locally, Bob Starr and Al Wisk called the game for the Rams over KMPC in Los Angeles, while WTAE-AM in Pittsburgh featured the Steelers' play-by-play team of Jack Fleming and Myron Cope. The KMPC broadcast, thanks to an agreement with the Iranian militants, Iran's Ministry of National Guidance and KMPC reporter Alex Paen, would be recorded and played for the Americans held hostage in Iran.

The famous Coca-Cola commercial (titled "Hey Kid, Catch!") in which "Mean" Joe Greene gives a boy his game jersey aired during CBS' telecast of the game. However, it is technically not viewed as a Super Bowl ad since it actually debuted on October 1, 1979, not during the day of the game. 60 Minutes was broadcast after the game, representing the Super Bowl lead-out program.

Entertainment

The Los Angeles Unified School District All-City Band played during the pregame ceremonies. Later, actress and singer Cheryl Ladd performed the national anthem. The coin toss ceremony featured longtime Steelers owner Art Rooney.

The performance event group Up with People performed during the halftime show titled "A Salute to the Big Band Era".

This was the first of 9 consecutive Super Bowls to feature the football-style logo at the 35-yard line.

Game summary
Despite being the underdogs, the Rams managed to hang onto a 13–10 lead at halftime, and a 19–17 lead at the beginning of the fourth quarter. But the Steelers held the Rams scoreless in the fourth quarter and scored two touchdowns for the win. Despite the game's uneven matchup and the final score, this game is regarded by some as one of the most competitive games in Super Bowl history. Overall, the lead changed seven times between both teams, a Super Bowl record (Pittsburgh took the lead 4 times, while Los Angeles took it 3 times).

First quarter
The Rams took the opening kickoff but the Steel Curtain forced a three-and-out. Then on the Steelers' 7th play of their first possession, quarterback Terry Bradshaw completed a 32-yard pass to fullback Franco Harris to reach the Los Angeles 26-yard line. But a third down pass fell incomplete, forcing Pittsburgh to settle for a 41-yard field goal from rookie kicker Matt Bahr.

Bahr's ensuing kickoff was very short, giving the Rams great field position at their 41-yard line. On the first play of the drive, Los Angeles running back Wendell Tyler caught a 6-yard pass from Vince Ferragamo. Then on the next play, Tyler took a handoff, ran left, broke some tackles, and ran 39 yards to the Steelers 14-yard line before he was finally dragged down by Pittsburgh defensive back Donnie Shell, the longest run against the Steelers all season. Shell saved the touchdown by making the tackle after previously being knocked to the turf five yards past the line of scrimmage. 6 plays later, fullback Cullen Bryant scored on a 1-yard touchdown run to give the Rams a 7–3 lead. The score was the Steelers' first rushing touchdown allowed in Super Bowl competition in franchise history.

But the lead did not last long. Pittsburgh defensive back Larry Anderson returned the ensuing kickoff 45 yards to his own 47-yard line, and then the Steelers marched 53 yards in 9 plays using every offensive weapon in their arsenal. First, Harris ran for 12 yards, halfback Rocky Bleier ran for 1, then tight end Bennie Cunningham caught a pass for 8. Bleier ran again for 2, followed by Bradshaw's 12-yard completion to receiver Lynn Swann on the last play of the first quarter.

Second quarter

The second period opened with Bradshaw's 13-yard completion to Cunningham to reach the Los Angeles 5-yard line, and then Harris ran through the middle to the 4. Wide receiver John Stallworth was then stopped at the 1-yard line, but then Harris ran to the right untouched and scored a touchdown on the next play, giving the Steelers a 10–7 lead. Harris's touchdown run, his third in Super Bowl play, broke the previous record of two set by Elijah Pitts in Super Bowl I and by the Butch and Sundance Duo of Jim Kiick and Larry Csonka in Super Bowls VII and VIII (Kiick rushed for a touchdown in both games while Csonka scored twice in VIII en route to winning that games most valuable player award).

However, like the Rams' previous lead, the Steelers' lead also turned out to be short-lived. Aided by a 20-yard pass interference penalty against Shell, Los Angeles advanced 67 yards in 10 plays to score on 31-yard field goal from kicker Frank Corral to tie the game. Anderson gave the Steelers great field position after returning the ensuing kickoff 38 yards to the Pittsburgh 46-yard line, but the Steelers could not move the ball and had to punt. The Rams were also forced to punt on their next possession after only gaining 6 yards. But on the first play of the Steelers' next drive, Los Angeles defensive back Dave Elmendorf intercepted a pass from Bradshaw and returned it 10 yards to Pittsburgh's 39-yard line.

On the first two plays after the turnover, Ferragamo was sacked for a 10-yard loss and threw an incomplete pass. But he managed to overcome the situation with a 12-yard completion to Bryant on third down and a 10-yard completion to receiver Billy Waddy on 4th down and 8. Ferragamo's next pass was complete to tight end Terry Nelson for a first down at the 13-yard line, but after throwing two incompletions, Pittsburgh lineman John Banaszak sacked Ferragamo on third down. However, Corral kicked a 45-yard field goal to give the Rams a 13–10 halftime lead.

Third quarter
The heavily favored Steelers trailed at the end of the half.  "How can you mess up this way?" Steelers assistant coach Woody Widenhofer asked his team at halftime. "Didn't we go over these things a dozen times? You guys are standing out there like statues."

Anderson once again gave the Steelers great starting field position, returning the opening kickoff of the second half 37 yards to the Pittsburgh 39-yard line. The Steelers lulled the Rams defense by running the ball on three consecutive plays of the drive, and then Bradshaw burned them with a 47-yard touchdown completion to Swann, who made a leaping catch at the Los Angeles 2-yard line and tumbled into the end zone to give Pittsburgh a 17–13 lead.

But they didn't hold it. After two plays of the ensuing drive, Ferragamo completed a 50-yard pass to Waddy. Then on the next play, Ferragamo handed the ball off to running back Lawrence McCutcheon, who started to run to the right. The Steelers' defense came up to tackle him behind the line of scrimmage, only to watch him throw a 24-yard touchdown pass to Ron Smith. Corral missed the extra point attempt, but the Rams had retaken the lead, 19–17.

The Steelers had some success advancing into Rams territory on their next two possessions, only to see the Rams intercept the ball both times. First, Rams free safety Eddie Brown stopped the ensuing Steelers drive with an interception, lateraling to Pat Thomas to gain an additional two yards. Then after a punt, Pittsburgh drove all the way to the Rams 16-yard line, but Los Angeles defensive back Rod Perry intercepted a pass intended for Stallworth. Thus, the third quarter ended with the Rams still in the lead, 19–17, seemingly in control of the game. Worse yet, Pittsburgh lost Swann to injury, when he was knocked out of the game by Pat Thomas.

Fourth quarter

With 12:59 left in the game, Rams punter Ken Clark's 59-yard punt planted Pittsburgh back on their own 25-yard line. Then faced with 3rd down and 8, Bradshaw took the snap, dropped back, and then threw a pass to Stallworth, who was running a streak pattern down the middle of the field.  Stallworth caught the ball barely beyond the outstretched hand of Perry and took it all the way to the end zone for a 73-yard go-ahead touchdown to make the score 24–19 for the Steelers. When being interviewed for the documentary series America's Game, Stallworth said that Bradshaw had overthrown him and departed his planned route and simply ran towards the goal line. The NFL Films highlight film notes that safety Eddie Brown was supposed to help Perry in covering Stallworth, but for some reason, Brown ignored the Steeler receiver. On the ensuing kickoff, the Rams tried a reverse, which resulted in poor field position.

After an exchange of punts, the Rams mounted one final, spirited drive to regain the lead. Ferragamo smartly moved the Rams down the field, completing 3 out of 4 passes around runs by Tyler. His 15-yard completion to Waddy on 3rd and 13 moved the Rams to the Pittsburgh 32-yard line with just under 6 minutes remaining. However, on the following play, Ferragamo made his first and only mistake of the game. Despite the fact that Waddy had broken free down the right side of the field, Ferragamo had zeroed in on Ron Smith down the middle of the field, but he didn't notice Pittsburgh linebacker Jack Lambert playing behind Smith. As Ferragamo released the ball, Lambert jumped in front of Smith and intercepted the pass with 5:24 remaining.

When faced with a 3rd down and 7 on their ensuing drive, Bradshaw once again made a crucial long pass completion to Stallworth, this time a 45-yard reception to the Rams 22-yard line, barely beyond the outstretched hand of Perry. Stallworth's clutch catch, his 3rd and final reception of the game, came off the same play that he scored the touchdown on and just like before Bradshaw misjudged Stallworth and instead underthrew him. During the same America's Game interview, Stallworth said if Bradshaw threw it out a little more they could have scored again. Two plays later, a pass interference penalty on Los Angeles cornerback Pat Thomas in the end zone gave the Steelers a first down at the 1-yard line. The Rams managed to keep Bleier and Harris out of the end zone for two plays, but Harris then scored on a third-down, 1-yard touchdown run to give the Steelers a 31–19 lead and put the game away. The Rams responded by driving to Pittsburgh's 37-yard line, but ended up turning over the ball on downs with 39 seconds left in the game, and the Steelers ran out the clock for the win.

Aftermath
The city of Pittsburgh celebrated its third major pro championship in 13 months. The Steelers had also won the previous year's Super Bowl, and the city's Major League Baseball team, the Pirates, had won the World Series three months before this Super Bowl game. Ten days after the Steelers' Super Bowl victory, the city's National Hockey League team, the Pittsburgh Penguins, changed its uniform colors to match the black and gold scheme of the Pirates and Steelers, as well as that of the Pittsburgh city flag.

This was the third time in Super Bowl history that a team overcame a deficit entering the fourth quarter to win the game. The Baltimore Colts entered the final quarter down 13–6 against Dallas in Super Bowl V and won the game 16–13. The Pittsburgh Steelers started the final period against Dallas in Super Bowl X down 10–7 and eventually won the game 21–17. The lead had changed hands seven times, a Super Bowl record to this day. Pittsburgh took the lead four times, while Los Angeles took it three times. Franco Harris, Lynn Swann, and John Stallworth became the fourth, fifth and sixth players to score touchdowns in back-to-back Super Bowls, respectively.  They had to celebrate when Swann returned from the hospital after being injured.

Ferragamo finished the game with 15 out of 25 completions for 212 yards, with 1 interception. Tyler was the top rusher of the game with 60 yards, and caught 2 passes for 20 yards. Waddy was the Rams leading receiver with 3 catches for 75 yards. Harris led the Steelers in rushing with 44 yards and 2 touchdowns, while also catching 3 passes for 66 yards. Stallworth was the top receiver of the game with 3 receptions for 121 yards and a touchdown, an average of 40.3 yards per catch. Swann had 5 catches for 79 yards and a touchdown. Larry Anderson set a Super Bowl record with 162 yards from his 5 kickoff returns.

The Rams would remain competitive in the 1980s but wouldn't reach another Super Bowl until their victory in Super Bowl XXXIV in January 2000, after the team had moved to St. Louis before the 1995 season. The closest the Los Angeles Rams would get to getting back to another Super Bowl in the 1980s, was in 1985, when they advanced to the NFC title game before falling to the eventual Super Bowl champion Chicago Bears, and in 1989; reaching the NFC Championship before losing to division rival and defending Super Bowl champion San Francisco. Following the loss in the 1989 NFC championship game, the Rams suffered through nine consecutive losing seasons and had the NFL's worst record of the 1990s until the 1999 championship season. They would make 2 Super Bowl appearances with the first being 2 years following their return to Los Angeles in 2016 in Super Bowl LIII, but fell to the New England Patriots by a score of 13-3, and their second being in Super Bowl LVI where they defeated the Cincinnati Bengals by a score of 23-20.

Wendell Tyler eventually won a Super Bowl as a featured back for the San Francisco 49ers in 1984. 1984 was also Jack Youngblood's 14th and final season in the NFL. The last link of the 1979 team was Jackie Slater, who remained on the team until 1995, the club's first season in St. Louis. He set an NFL record by playing 20 seasons with one team, yet Super Bowl XIV remained his lone trip to the Big Game. Slater was the last Ram to have been a teammate of legendary defensive tackle Merlin Olsen, who anchored the Rams' Fearsome Foursome for 15 seasons (1962–76).

Pittsburgh would go 9–7 the following season and miss the playoffs. They would go 8–8 in 1981 before making the playoffs the next three seasons. Many of the links that powered the Steelers to their Super Bowl wins began to retire shortly after Super Bowl XIV, starting with Rocky Bleier in 1980 and Joe Greene in 1981. Ham spent all of 1982 on injured reserve before retiring. Bradshaw sat out all but one half of the 1983 season before retiring due to recurring elbow injuries, and Blount retired after that season as well. The Steelers were also haunted by their decision to pass on Dan Marino, the standout quarterback for the University of Pittsburgh, in the 1983 NFL Draft. The Steelers' first-round selection of 1983, Texas Tech defensive tackle Gabriel Rivera, was paralyzed in an automobile accident after seven weeks of his rookie season.  Terry Bradshaw would miss the first 14 games of the 1983 season due to an elbow injury.  His final game was against the New York Jets which he started and led two touchdown drives before being forced out due to another elbow injury following a 10 yard TD pass to Calvin Sweeney.

Lambert was slowed throughout 1984 by a painful turf toe, retiring after that campaign. Stallworth, Webster, and Shell would play well into the 1980s and helped lead Pittsburgh to the 1984 AFC Championship game, where they lost to Marino's Miami Dolphins. But they would not reach a Super Bowl until the 1995 season, losing to the Dallas Cowboys 27–17 in Super Bowl XXX. Kicker Matt Bahr would win another Super Bowl with the New York Giants during the 1990 season. He kicked the game-winning field goal in Super Bowl XXV, and a week earlier booted the game-winning field goal against the San Francisco 49ers in the NFC Championship Game, thus denying the 49ers a chance at three straight Super Bowl victories and surpassing the Steelers' total of four Super Bowl titles. Chuck Noll, the last link to Pittsburgh's dynasty, retired from coaching following the 1991 season. Only Bill Belichick matched (and later surpassed) Noll's four Vince Lombardi Trophies as a head coach. The Steelers' record of four Super Bowls in six seasons has yet to be matched.

Box score

Final statistics
Sources: NFL.com Super Bowl XIV , Super Bowl XIV Play Finder Pit, Super Bowl XIV Play Finder LA

Statistical comparison

Individual statistics

1Completions/attempts
2Carries
3Long gain
4Receptions
5Times targeted

Records set
The following records were set in Super Bowl XIV, according to the official NFL.com box score and the Pro-Football-Reference.com game summary. Some records have to meet NFL minimum number of attempts to be recognized. The minimums are shown (in parentheses).
 

 Terry Bradshaw threw 3 interceptions in this game, increasing his career interception percentage in Super Bowls to 4.8%. This meant that Bart Starr once again held the record for "Lowest percentage, passes had intercepted, career, (40 attempts)" with 2.1% (1–47). Jim Plunkett would surpass this record in Super Bowl XVIII with 0.0% (0–46).
 † This category includes rushing, receiving, interception returns, punt returns, kickoff returns, and fumble returns.

Turnovers are defined as the number of times losing the ball on interceptions and fumbles.

Starting lineups
Source:

Officials
Referee: Fred Silva #7 first Super Bowl on field (alternate for IX)
Umpire: Al Conway #7 second Super Bowl (IX)
Head Linesman: Burl Toler #18 first Super Bowl 
Line Judge: Bob Beeks #16 first Super Bowl
Back Judge: Stan Javie #6 fourth Super Bowl (II, VIII, X)
Side Judge: Ben Tompkins #4 first Super Bowl
Field Judge: Charley Musser #19 second Super Bowl (IV)
Alternate Referee: Jerry Seeman #17 worked Super Bowls XXIII and XXV on field
Alternate Official: Norm Kragseth (line judge) only Super Bowl assignment

NOTE: Officials were numbered separately by position from 1979-81. In 1982, the league reverted to the pre-1979 practice of assigning each official a different number.

This was the first Super Bowl officiating crew with two African-Americans (Toler and Beeks).

Stan Javie became the second man to officiate four Super Bowls, joining Jack Fette, whose fourth assignment was Super Bowl XIII.

References
Notes

Sources

http://www.pro-football-reference.com – Large online database of NFL data and statistics
Super Bowl play-by-plays from USA Today (Last accessed September 28, 2005)
All-Time Super Bowl Odds  from The Sports Network (Last accessed October 16, 2005)
https://www.nfl.com/super-bowl/history/1980

External links
 Super Bowl official website

Super Bowl
Pittsburgh Steelers postseason
Los Angeles Rams postseason
1979 National Football League season
1980 in American football
American football competitions in California
1980 in sports in California
Sports competitions in Pasadena, California
January 1980 sports events in the United States
20th century in Pasadena, California